José Luis Rondo Polo (born 19 March 1976) is an Equatoguinean retired footballer. He started his career as a forward, subsequently moving to right winger and finally right back.

He spent his entire career in his native Spain, representing five clubs at the professional level.

During six years, Rondo was an Equatorial Guinea international.

Club career
Rondo was born in Palma, Majorca, Balearic Islands. An unsuccessful RCD Mallorca youth graduate – he could only appear for their reserves – he would manage to spend seven seasons in the second division, with Getafe CF, Elche CF and UD Vecindario; his first experience at that level was precisely with Mallorca B, in 1998–99 (31 matches played, team relegation).

After a one-year spell with CD Constancia (division four, also in Majorca), Rondo signed with neighbours CE Andratx of the same tier.

International career
Spanish-born, Rondo would however represent the land of one of his parents, Equatorial Guinea, in the molds of several players whom played in Spain: Javier Balboa, Rodolfo Bodipo, Benjamín Zarandona, etc.

References

External links

1976 births
Living people
Spanish sportspeople of Equatoguinean descent
Citizens of Equatorial Guinea through descent
Equatoguinean sportspeople of Spanish descent
Footballers from Palma de Mallorca
Spanish footballers
Equatoguinean footballers
Association football defenders
Segunda División players
Segunda División B players
Tercera División players
Divisiones Regionales de Fútbol players
RCD Mallorca B players
Getafe CF footballers
Elche CF players
CD Castellón footballers
Algeciras CF footballers
UD Vecindario players
CE Constància players
Equatorial Guinea international footballers
CE Andratx footballers